Silvester van der Water (born 30 September 1996) is a Dutch professional footballer who plays as a winger for Eredivisie club Cambuur.

Club career

Almere City 
In 2014, van der Water joined the Almere City academy from amateur side SDO Bussum where he had spent 11 years. Ahead of the 2015–16 season, van der Water was moved up to the club's under-21 team contesting the Beloften Eredivisie. That same season he was promoted to the senior team, making his senior debut on 12 February 2016 as an 82nd minute substitute for Travis Brent in a 2–1 Eerste Divisie defeat to FC Eindhoven. He scored his first senior goals for the club on his third appearance, netting a brace in a 7–0 win over Jong PSV. He began the following season a regular starter but as Almere City's form declined, van der Water was dropped to the bench, earning most of his playing time as either a substitute or with the under-21s.

After eight goals in nine games in the Derde Divisie with Jong Almere City to start the 2017–18 season, van der Water earned a recall to the first-team. He scored 12 goals in 26 regular season appearances before proving instrumental in the 2017–18 promotion playoffs with three goals and three assists in six games as Almere City reached the final but missed out on the club's first promotion to the Eredivisie, losing to De Graafschap 3–2 over two legs.

Heracles Almelo 
On 31 May 2018, van der Water agreed a three-year (with one optional year) contract with Eredivisie club Heracles Almelo. On 18 August 2018 he made his first division debut as an 81st minute substitute as part of a 4–2 win over ADO Den Haag. He registered one assist in his first season with the club, failing to score a senior goal although he scored 12 goals in 14 appearances with Jong Heracles in the Reservecompetitie. He eventually scored his first senior goal for Heracles on matchday two of the 2019–20 season as part of a 1–1 draw with Fortuna Sittard.

After scoring and assisting in the 2020–21 season opening 2–0 victory over ADO Den Haag, van der Water pulled out of the squad for the week two 4–0 defeat to Willem II on 20 September 2020 following reported transfer interest from MLS team Orlando City. He met with manager Frank Wormuth the following day for discussions and was fined for his absence before being sent home to train away from the team with the club addressing the issue in an official statement. He returned to the squad the following week for the 1–1 draw with PSV Eindhoven. Transfer speculation returned in the winter window and on 19 February 2021, Wormuth confirmed van der Water had been given permission to leave the squad to complete a transfer. With three goals and four assists in the first half of the season, van der Water was second only to Rai Vloet in goal involvements on the team at the time of his transfer.

Orlando City 
On 23 February 2021, Orlando City confirmed the signing of van der Water on a three-year contract plus a club option on a TAM deal. He made his club debut on 17 April as substitute for Alexandre Pato in the 80th minute of a season-opening goalless draw with Atlanta United. Van der Water made his first start in place of the suspended Nani on 22 May 2021. He provided the assist for Tesho Akindele on the only goal of the game and was named player of the match as Orlando beat Toronto FC 1–0 to maintain their unbeaten start to the season. He scored his first goal for the club on 29 May 2021 as a substitute in a 2–1 defeat away to New York Red Bulls.

Cambuur
On 1 July 2022, Van der Water signed a three-year contract with an option for an additional year with Cambuur.

Career statistics

Club

References

External links
 
 
 Voetbal International profile 

1996 births
Living people
People from Blaricum
Dutch footballers
Association football wingers
Almere City FC players
Heracles Almelo players
Orlando City SC players
SC Cambuur players
Eredivisie players
Eerste Divisie players
Major League Soccer players
Dutch expatriate footballers
Expatriate soccer players in the United States
Dutch expatriate sportspeople in the United States
SDO Bussum players
Sportspeople from North Holland